The 1998 Massachusetts gubernatorial election was held on November 3, 1998. Acting Governor Paul Cellucci was elected to his first term as Governor of Massachusetts.

Republican primary

Governor

Candidates
 Paul Cellucci, acting Governor
 Joe Malone, Massachusetts Treasurer and Receiver-General

Campaign
The race between Cellucci and Malone was acrimonious, with each candidate accusing the other of committing ethical violations.

Results
On September 16, Cellucci defeated Malone to win his party's nomination.

Lieutenant Governor

Candidates
 Janet E. Jeghelian, radio host (running with Malone)
 Jane M. Swift, Secretary of Consumer Affairs (running with Cellucci)

Declined
 Charlie Baker, Secretary of Administration and Finance
 Ralph C. Martin II, Suffolk County District Attorney

Results

Democratic primary

Governor

Candidates
 Brian J. Donnelly, former U.S. Representative and United States Ambassador to Trinidad and Tobago
 Scott Harshbarger, Massachusetts Attorney General
 Patricia McGovern, State Senator from Lawrence

Withdrew
Joseph Kennedy II, U.S. Representative for Massachusetts's 8th congressional district

Results

Lieutenant Governor

Candidates
 Dorothy Kelly Gay, Governor's Councilor from Somerville
 Warren Tolman, State Senator from Watertown

Results

General election

Campaign
After Harshbarger's primary victory, many moderate Democrats who had voted for McGovern or Donnelly, chose to support the socially liberal, fiscally moderate Cellucci instead of the more liberal Harshbarger.

Polling
In a January opinion poll, Cellucci lead Harshbarger 50%-30%. By August, Harshbarger had taken a 37%-35% lead over Cellucci.

Results

On November 3, Cellucci defeated Harshbarger by 65,317 votes.

Results by county

See also
Massachusetts general election, 1998
 1997–1998 Massachusetts legislature

References

Gubernatorial
1998
1998 United States gubernatorial elections